Yas Chaman (also Romanized as Yās Chaman) is a village in Shahidabad Rural District, Mashhad-e Morghab District, Khorrambid County, Fars Province, Iran. At the 2006 census, its population was 62, in 13 families.

References 

Populated places in Khorrambid County